Caladenia leptochila, commonly known s narrow-lipped spider-orchid or narrow-lipped caladenia, is a species of flowering plant in the orchid family Orchidaceae and is endemic to South Australia. It is a ground orchid with a single slender, hairy leaf and one or two yellowish-green and reddish-brown flowers.

Description

Taxonomy and naming
Caladenia leptochila was first formally described in 1882 by Robert D. FitzGerald in The Gardeners' Chronicle from specimens collected on Mount Lofty. 

In 2008, Robyn Mary Barker and Robert John Bates trasferred Arachnorchis leptochila subsp. dentata D.L.Jones to the genus Caladenia as Caladenia leptochila subsp. dentata in the Journal of the Adelaide Botanic Gardens, and the name, and that of the autonym are accepted by the Australian Plant Census:
 Caladenia leptochila subsp. dentata (D.L.Jones) R.J.Bates
 Caladenia leptochila Fitzg. subsp. leptochila

Distribution and habitat
The latter subspecies is thought to have been common in Victoria in the past but is now probably extinct in that state.

References

 leptochila
Endemic orchids of Australia
Orchids of South Australia
Orchids of Victoria (Australia)
Taxa named by Robert D. FitzGerald
Plants described in 1882